Jia Nan Yuan (or Yuan Jianan, born 11 July 1985)  is a Chinese-born table tennis player representing France.

Born in China, she moved to France at the age of 18. In 2011, she acquired French citizenship. Since 2018, she represents France in international competitions.

She competed at the 2020 Tokyo Olympic Games, finished fourth at the mixed doubles event.

References 

1985 births
French female table tennis players
Living people
People from Zhengzhou
Olympic table tennis players of France
Table tennis players at the 2020 Summer Olympics
Chinese emigrants to France
French people of Chinese descent
Naturalized citizens of France